HMS Thrasher (N37) was a T-class submarine of the Royal Navy. She was laid down by Cammell Laird & Co Limited, Birkenhead, launched in November 1940, and had an active career in the Mediterranean and Pacific Far East.

Mediterranean

Thrasher began her service by heavily damaging the French fishing vessel Virgo Fidelis in the Bay of Biscay, while in transit to the Mediterranean. The Virgo Fidelis was beached, but declared a total loss. She also unsuccessfully attacked the German transport Ankara and the German merchant Arkadia. She also attacked the German barge F 184, but was forced to withdraw due to return fire. In July 1942, Thrasher was bombed in error by a British Fairey Swordfish aircraft off Port Said, Egypt, causing damage that took a month to repair.

Thrasher sank  of enemy shipping during the Mediterranean campaign.

Double VC
On 16 February 1942 north of Crete, Thrasher, was attacked after sinking a supply ship. After surfacing later, two unexploded bombs were discovered in the gun-casing. Lieutenant Peter Scawen Watkinson Roberts and Petty Officer Thomas William Gould removed the first one without too much difficulty, but the second was lying in a very confined space and they had to approach it lying full length. Gould lay on his back with the bomb in his arms while Roberts dragged him along by the shoulders. It was 50 minutes before they got the bomb clear and dropped it over the side.  As a result of their heroic actions which likely saved Thrasher, both men were awarded the Victoria Cross.  The citation read "The King has been Graciously pleased to approve of the grant of the Victoria Cross for great valour while serving in HM Submarine Thrasher to Lieutenant Peter Scawen Watkinson Roberts, RN and Petty Officer Thomas William Gould.
"On February 16th, in daylight, HM Submarine Thrasher attacked and sank a heavily escorted supply ship. She was at once attacked by depth-charges and was bombed by aircraft. The presence of two unexploded bombs in the gun-casing was discovered when after dark the submarine surfaced and began to roll. Lieutenant Roberts and Petty Officer Gould volunteered to remove the bombs, which were of a type unknown to them. The danger in dealing with the second bomb was very great. To reach it they had to go through the casing, which was so low that they had to lie at full length to move in it. Through this narrow space, in complete darkness, they pushed and dragged the bomb for a distance of some 20 feet until it could be lowered over the side. Every time the bomb was moved there was a loud twanging noise as of a broken spring which added nothing to their peace of mind. This deed was more gallant as HM Submarine Thrasher's presence was known to the enemy; she was close to the enemy coast and in waters where his patrols were known to be active day and night. There was a very great chance, and they knew it, that the submarine might have to crash-dive while they were under the casing. Had this happened they must have been drowned."

Far East

Thrasher was assigned to the Far East in the early part of 1945.  She sank 20 sailing vessels and four coasters before the end of the war.

She survived the war and was broken up for scrap at one of the yards of Thos. W. Ward, Briton Ferry, Wales on 9 March 1947.

References

Bibliography

External links
 IWM Interview with Hugh Mackenzie, who commanded HMS Thrasher from 1941 to 1943

 

British T-class submarines of the Royal Navy
Ships built on the River Mersey
1940 ships
World War II submarines of the United Kingdom